Memoni is an Indo-Aryan language spoken by Kathiawari Memons from the Kathiawar region of Gujarat, India. 

The Kathiawari Memons are a sub-group of the Memon people, a Muslim community in India and Pakistan. After the partition of India in 1947, Memons of the Kathiawar region migrated to neighboring states, cities and towns within India, but a large number of Memons settled in Pakistan, Sri Lanka, South Africa, Malawi, Kenya, as well as the United States and Canada.

History
The origin of the Memoni language is still debated among the historians of the region.  It has several different dialects and accents due to the influence of other languages in areas of settlement. Memoni is a mixture of Sindhi, Kutchi and Gujarati languages. Haji Mohammed Husein Abdel Kareem Nagani spent 40 years inventing a Memoni alphabet in order to bring the Memoni language up to the standard of other major languages in the world.

The Memon community is generally divided into three major subgroups, Kathiawari Memons, who originated in the Kathiawar region (who speak Memoni), Sindhi Memons (who speak Sindhi) and Kutchi Memons (who speak Kutchi). The Memon people from Kathiawar were largely Muslims who followed Hanafi Islam. 

Sindhi and Kutchi are spoken by both Muslims and non-Muslims, in contrast to the Memoni language, which is exclusively spoken by Memons of Kathiawar origin, who are almost entirely Muslims.

In stress, intonation, and everyday speech, Memoni is very similar to Sindhi or Kutchi, but it borrows extensively from Gujarati, Hindustani and Arabic. Like most languages of the Indian subcontinent, the sentence structure of Memoni generally follows subject–object–verb order. Especially in Pakistan, Memoni language has adopted many Urdu words and phrases. Even between different villages of Kathiawar, variations have arisen.

Nouns
Most nouns have a grammatical gender, either masculine or feminine, and often have singular and plural forms. Vast majorities of nouns have been borrowed from Hindustani (umbrella term for Urdu and Hindi), and English vocabulary is extensively used.

Example

Articles and determiner
There is no equivalent for the definite article the, and the indefinite article a is further inflected as masculine or feminine with its object.

Pronouns
The accusative, possessive and reflexive pronouns are often inflected for masculine and feminine and their gender must agree with their referents.

See also: Urdu pronouns

Example

In most Indic languages regarding the third person such as, he, she, it and they and the demonstrative pronouns this, these, that, those, the same pronouns are used. They are divided into two categories, one for a near object or person and the other for a far object or person.

Example 2

No significant differences are made among the object, possessive and reflexive pronouns. In addition these pronouns are further inflected for masculine and feminine and must agree with the object (noun, pronouns, adjective and adverbs).

Verbs
Verbs are generally conjugated according to person, number, tense, aspect, mood and voice. They may also agree with the person gender, and/or number of some of their other arguments, including the object.  The verb generally appears at the end of the sentence.

Adjectives
Like English, the position of the adjectives nearly always appears immediately before the noun and they are modified and often inflected for masculine and feminine and must agree with the noun that follows. The proposition generally comes after a noun or a verb.

Script
In the past there have been some attempts to write the Memoni dialect using the Gujarati, and later, Urdu, scripts with little success. Some attempts have been made to write Memoni using the Latin script.

References

External links
Reference: Origin of Memoni Language a Memoni Language Project by Siddique Katiya

Sindhi language
Gujarati language
Memon
Languages of India
Languages of Sindh
Northwestern Indo-Aryan languages
Subject–object–verb languages
Languages of Gujarat